Bryan B. King (born September 16, 1968) is a Republican politician serving in the Arkansas Senate representing the 28th district (Carroll and Madison County and parts of Boone, Crawford,  Newton, and Johnson counties). He previously served in the Senate from 2013 to 2019, and in the Arkansas House of Representatives from 2007 to 2013.

Early life
He was born in Springdale, Arkansas, and graduated from Green Forest High School in Green Forest in Carroll County. He received a Bachelor of Science degree in Animal Science from the Dale Bumpers College of Agricultural, Food and Life Sciences at the University of Arkansas.

Career
He owns Triple K Farms in Green Forest.

From 2007 to 2013, he served as a Republican member of the Arkansas House of Representatives for District 91. He was a member of the House Insurance and Commerce Committee, the Arkansas Legislative Council, where he was chairman of the Personnel Committee, the Joint Budget Committee and the House Public Health, Welfare and Labor Committee.

From 2013 to 2019, he has served as state senator.

As such, he is the chairman of Legislative Joint Auditing Committee and a member of the Senate Judiciary, Senate State Agencies Governmental Affairs, Senate Rules, Resolutions & Memorials, Joint Performance Review, Joint Budget Committee (JBC), the Arkansas Legislative Council and JBC Claims. In January 2013, he introduced a bill allowing concealed carry handguns in churches or other places of worship.

When King moved to the Senate, the Republican Dan Douglas of Bentonville ran without opposition for King's District 91 House seat.

Personal life
 He attends the Church on the Hill Assembly of God in Berryville in Carroll County.

References

1968 births
Living people
People from Springdale, Arkansas
People from Carroll County, Arkansas
University of Arkansas alumni
Republican Party members of the Arkansas House of Representatives
Republican Party Arkansas state senators
Farmers from Arkansas
21st-century American politicians